Austromerope brasiliensis is one of only two living representatives of the genus Austromerope (the other is the Australian Austromerope poultoni). It is apparently endemic to Brazil, with large forceps-like structures at the tail and two pairs of wings. Only adults are known - no larval stage has been seen.

References

Mecoptera
Endemic fauna of Brazil